Woggersin is a municipality in the district of Mecklenburgische Seenplatte, in Mecklenburg-Vorpommern, Germany.

References